Haapajärvi is a town and municipality of Finland.

It is located in the province of Oulu and is part of the Northern Ostrobothnia region.

Neighbour municipalities are Haapavesi, Kärsämäki, Nivala, Pihtipudas, Pyhäjärvi, Reisjärvi and Sievi.

The municipality is unilingually Finnish.

History
Haapajärvi was first mentioned in 1548 as Hapaierffue (a Swedish transcription of the Finnish name), when it was a part of the parish of Kalajoki. The first church was built in 1649 or 1653. Haapajärvi acquired chapel rights in 1698 and became an independent parish in 1838, also including the chapel communities of Pidisjärvi and Reisjärvi. Both Reisjärvi and Pidisjärvi (Nivala) were separated in 1868.

A chapel was built in the village of Olkkola for the Laestadian community in the 1920s, however it has never been officially designated as a church or a chapel. Olkkola was a chapel community from 1927 to 1978.

Villages

Notable people
 Petri Tapio Mattson (born 1973), Finnish violinist and ensemble director
 Johan Gabriel Ståhlberg (1832–1873), Finnish priest and father of President K. J. Ståhlberg

Gallery

See also
 Finnish national road 58

References

External links

Town of Haapajärvi – Official website

Cities and towns in Finland
Municipalities of North Ostrobothnia
Populated places established in 1868